Protein SOX-15 is a protein that in humans is encoded by the SOX15 gene.

This gene encodes a member of the SOX (SRY-related HMG-box) family of transcription factors involved in the regulation of embryonic development and in the determination of the cell fate. The encoded protein may act as a transcriptional regulator after forming a protein complex with other proteins.

See also
 SOX genes

References

Further reading

Transcription factors